Dectes sayi is a species of longhorn beetles of the subfamily Lamiinae. It was described by Dillon and Dillon in 1953.

References

Beetles described in 1953
Acanthocinini